1961 Emperor's Cup Final was the 41st final of the Emperor's Cup competition. The final was played at Fujieda Higashi High School Ground in Shizuoka on May 7, 1961. Furukawa Electric won the championship.

Overview
Defending champion Furukawa Electric won their 2nd title, by defeating Chuo University 3–2. Furukawa Electric won the title for 2 years in a row.

Match details

See also
1961 Emperor's Cup

References

Emperor's Cup
1961 in Japanese football
JEF United Chiba matches